Jumanji is a 1995 American fantasy adventure film directed by Joe Johnston from a screenplay by Jonathan Hensleigh, Greg Taylor, and Jim Strain, based on the 1981 children's picture book of the same name by Chris Van Allsburg. The film is the first installment in the Jumanji film series.  It stars Robin Williams, Kirsten Dunst, David Alan Grier, Bonnie Hunt, Jonathan Hyde, and Bebe Neuwirth. The story centers on a supernatural board game that releases jungle-based hazards upon its players with every turn they take.

Jumanji was released on December 15, 1995, by Sony Pictures Releasing. The film received mixed reviews from critics, but was a box-office success, grossing $263 million worldwide on a budget of approximately $65 million. It was the tenth-highest-grossing film of 1995.

The film spawned an animated television series, which aired from 1996 to 1999, and was followed by a spin-off film, Zathura: A Space Adventure (2005), and two indirect sequels, Jumanji: Welcome to the Jungle (2017) and Jumanji: The Next Level (2019).

Plot

In 1969, Alan Parrish lives with his parents Sam and Carol in Brantford, New Hampshire. One day, he escapes a group of bullies and retreats to Sam's shoe factory. He meets his friend, Carl Bentley, who reveals a new shoe prototype he made by himself. Alan misplaces the shoe and damages a conveyor belt, but Carl takes responsibility and loses his job. After the bullies attack Alan and steal his bicycle, Alan follows the sound of tribal drumbeats to a construction site. He finds a board game called Jumanji, which was buried 100 years earlier, and brings it home.

That night, after arguing with Sam about attending a boarding school, Alan plans to run away, but his friend, Sarah Whittle, returns his bicycle. Alan shows her Jumanji and invites her to play. With each roll of the dice, the game piece moves by itself and a cryptic message describing the roll's outcome appears in the crystal ball at the center of the board. After Alan inadvertently rolls a five, a message tells him to wait in a jungle until someone rolls a five or eight, and he is sucked into the game. Shortly after, a swarm of bats appears and chases Sarah out of the mansion.

Twenty-six years later, Judy and Peter Shepherd move into the now-vacant Parrish mansion with their aunt Nora, after their parents died in an accident on a ski trip in Canada the winter before. Discovering Jumanji in the attic, Judy and Peter begin playing it. Their rolls summon giant mosquitoes and swarms of monkeys. The game rules state everything will be restored when the game ends, so they continue playing. Peter then rolls a five which releases a lion and a grown-up Alan. As Alan makes his way out, he meets Carl, who is now working as a police officer. Alan, Judy, and Peter go to the now-abandoned shoe factory and learn that Sam abandoned the business to search for his son after his disappearance, until his 1991 death. Eventually, the factory closed, sending Brantford into economic decline.

Realizing they need Sarah to finish the game, the three locate Sarah, now haunted by both Jumanji and Alan's disappearance, and persuade her to join them. Sarah's first move releases fast-growing carnivorous vines, and Alan's next move releases a big-game hunter named Van Pelt, whom Alan first met in the game’s inner world. The next roll summons a stampede of various animals, and a pelican steals the game. Peter retrieves it, but Alan is arrested by Carl. Back in town, the stampede wreaks havoc, and Van Pelt steals the game.

Peter, Sarah, and Judy track Van Pelt to a discount store, where they set booby traps to subdue him and retrieve the game, while Alan, after revealing his identity to Carl, is set free. When the four return to the mansion, it is now completely overrun by jungle wildlife. They release one calamity after another until Van Pelt arrives. When Alan drops the dice, he wins the game which causes everything that happened as a result of the game to be reversed.

Alan and Sarah return to 1969, just in time for Alan to reconcile with Sam, who tells him that he does not have to attend boarding school. Alan also admits his responsibility for damaging the conveyor belt. After realizing that they have memories of the game, Alan and Sarah throw Jumanji into a river, then share a kiss.

In an alternate version of the present, Alan and Sarah are married and expecting their first child. Alan's parents are still alive and Alan is now successfully running the family business. Alan and Sarah meet Judy, Peter, and their parents Jim and Martha for the first time during a Christmas party. Alan offers Jim a job and convinces them to cancel their upcoming ski trip, averting their deaths.

Meanwhile, two young girls hear drumbeats while walking on a beach. Jumanji is seen lying partially buried in the sand.

Cast

 Robin Williams as Alan Parrish
 Kirsten Dunst as Judy Shepherd
 David Alan Grier as Carl "The Sole-man" Bentley
 Adam Hann-Byrd as young Alan Parrish
 Bonnie Hunt as Sarah Whittle
 Jonathan Hyde as Sam Parrish
 Hyde also portrays Van Pelt, a big-game hunter who resides in Jumanji.
 Bebe Neuwirth as Nora Shepherd
 Bradley Pierce as Peter Shepherd
 James Handy as the Exterminator
 Patricia Clarkson as Carol Parrish
 Laura Bell Bundy as young Sarah Whittle

Production

While Peter Guber was visiting Boston, he invited author Chris Van Allsburg, who lives in Providence, Rhode Island, to option his book. Van Allsburg wrote one of the screenplay's drafts, which he described as "sort of trying to imbue the story with a quality of mystery and surrealism". Van Allsburg added that the studio nearly abandoned the project if not for his film treatment, which earned him a story credit given it added story material that was not from the book.

TriStar Pictures agreed to finance the film on the condition that Robin Williams plays the starring role. However, Williams turned down the role based on the first script he was given. Only after director Joe Johnston and screenwriters Jonathan Hensleigh, Greg Taylor and Jim Strain undertook extensive rewrites did Williams accept. Johnston had reservations over casting Williams because of the actor's reputation for improvisation, fearing that he wouldn't adhere to the script. However, Williams understood that it was "a tightly structured story" and filmed the scenes as outlined in the script, often filming duplicate scenes afterward where he was allowed to improvise with Bonnie Hunt.

Tom Hanks was the first choice to play Alan Parrish but turned it down due to his commitments to Apollo 13. Other stars were considered, including: Dan Aykroyd, Bruce Willis, Michael Keaton, Kevin Kline, Chevy Chase, Sean Penn, Kevin Costner, Richard Dreyfuss, Michael Douglas, Rupert Everett, Harrison Ford, Sean Connery, Bill Paxton, Bryan Cranston, Arnold Schwarzenegger, and Alec Baldwin. Willis was unavailable because he was working on Die Hard with a Vengeance.

Kirstie Alley was considered for Sarah Whittle, while Scarlett Johansson auditioned for Judy Shepherd.

Shooting took place in various New England locales, mainly Keene, New Hampshire, which represented the story's fictional town of Brantford, New Hampshire, and North Berwick, Maine, where the Olde Woolen Mill stood in for the Parrish Shoe Factory. Additional filming took place in Vancouver, British Columbia, where a mock-up of the Parrish house was built.

Special effects were a combination of more traditional techniques like puppetry and animatronics (provided by Amalgamated Dynamics) with state-of-the-art digital effects overseen by Industrial Light & Magic. ILM developed two new software programs specifically for Jumanji, one called iSculpt, which allowed the illustrators to create realistic facial expressions on the computer-generated animals in the film, and another that for the first time created realistic digital hair, used on the monkeys and lion. Actor Bradley Pierce (Peter) underwent three and a half hours of prosthetic makeup application daily for a period of two and a half months to film the scenes where he slowly transformed into a monkey.

The film was dedicated to visual effects supervisor Stephen L. Price, who died before the film's release.

Release
Jumanji was released in theaters on December 15, 1995.

Home media
Jumanji was first released on VHS on May 14, 1996, and re-released as a Collector's Series DVD on January 25, 2000. In the UK, the film was also released on DVD as a special edition bundled with the Jumanji board game. The film was first released on Blu-ray on June 28, 2011, and re-released as a 20th Anniversary Edition on September 14, 2015. A restored version was released on December 5, 2017, on Blu-ray and 4K UHD to coincide with the premiere of the sequel, Jumanji: Welcome to the Jungle.

Reception

Box office
Jumanji did well at the box office, opening at No. 1 over taking Toy Story and earning $100.5 million in the United States and Canada and an additional $162.3 million overseas, bringing the worldwide gross to $262.8 million.

Critical response
Jumanji is widely considered to be a '90s classic. However, it initially received a mixed reception from critics. On Rotten Tomatoes, the film has an approval rating of 52% from 46 reviews, with an average rating of 6/10. The site's consensus reads: "A feast for the eyes with a somewhat shaky plot, Jumanji is a good adventure that still offers a decent amount of fun for the whole family". On Metacritic the film has a weighted average score of 39 out of 100, based on 18 critics, indicating "generally unfavorable reviews". Audiences polled by CinemaScore gave the film an average grade of "A−" on an A+ to F scale.

Roger Ebert rated the film one-and-a-half out of four stars, criticizing its reliance on special effects to convey its story, which he felt was lacking. He questioned the decision to rate the film PG rather than PG-13 as he felt that young children would be traumatized by much of the film's imagery, which he said made the film "about as appropriate for smaller children as, say, Jaws". He specifically cited Peter's monkey transformation as making him "look like a Wolf Man... with a hairy snout and wicked jaws" that were likely to scare children. Regarding the board game's unleashing one hazard after another at its main characters, Ebert concluded: "It's like those video games where you achieve one level after another by killing and not getting killed. The ultimate level for young viewers will be being able to sit all the way through the movie".

Van Allsburg approved of the film despite the changes from the book and it not being as "idiosyncratic and peculiar", declaring that "the film is faithful in reproducing the chaos level that comes with having a jungle animal in the house. It's a good movie".

Sequels

Zathura: A Space Adventure

Zathura: A Space Adventure, the spiritual successor that was marketed as being from the same continuity of the Jumanji franchise, was released as a feature film in 2005. Unlike the book Zathura, the film makes no references to the previous film outside the marketing statement. Both films are based on books written by Chris Van Allsburg. With the films being based on books that take place in the same series, the films vaguely make reference to that concept from the novels by having a similar concept and themes.

Jumanji: Welcome to the Jungle

A new film, Jumanji: Welcome to the Jungle is a sequel to the 1995 film. The film contains a whole new set of characters, with no original cast from the original film reprising their roles. The film sees four teenagers in 2017 who are stuck in Jumanji video game, whereas game avatars must finish the game and save Jumanji. 
Plans for a sequel started in the late 1990s by Sony Pictures Entertainment and the original director Ken Ralston, a visual effects supervisor of the original film, was hired to direct a film, with Christmas 2000 release date, but Ralston stepped down, and the sequel was cancelled. The development of the sequel again emerged in the 2010s, upon which then-president of Columbia Pictures Doug Belgrad teased a possibility of the project in July 2012; the project was confirmed three years later in August, with a new director Jake Kasdan directing it and starring Dwayne Johnson. The film was released on December 20, 2017, as a tribute to Robin Williams' lead and his character is mentioned within the film.

Jumanji: The Next Level

A fourth film in the franchise titled, Jumanji: The Next Level, a sequel to Welcome to the Jungle was released on December 13, 2019. Bebe Neuwirth reprises her role as Nora Shepherd in a cameo at the end of the film.

In other media

Television

An animated television series was produced between 1996 and 1999. While it borrowed heavily from the film – incorporating various characters, locations and props, and modelling Alan's house and the board game on the way they appeared in the film – the series retcons rather than using the film's storyline. In the series version, on each turn, the players are given a "game clue" and then sucked into the jungle until they solve it. Alan is stuck in Jumanji because he has not seen his clue. Judy and Peter try to help him leave the game, providing their motivation during the series, while Sarah is absent from the series, and Alan has a relationship with Aunt Nora instead of Sarah, which, unlike the film, gives a clear explanation about his position as Judy and Peter's uncle.

Games
Jumanji: The Game is a board game originally published by Milton Bradley Company in the US in 1995.

An updated version with new colorized artwork was released in 2017 by Cardinal Games. Some of the riddle message texts on the danger cards were changed, especially the unique danger messages. That year, designer Rachel Lowe won a British Game of the Year Award (awarded by the Toy Retailers Association) for the game.

Jumanji: A Jungle Adventure Game Pack is a North American-exclusive game for Microsoft Windows that was released on October 9, 1996. It was developed by Studio Interactive and published by Philips Interactive Media. It contains five different action-arcade-based mini-games that are based on popular scenes from the film. Clips of cutscenes from the film can also be viewed. There are five different mini-games that the player can choose from, with different rules and objectives. Animals from the film provide instructions to the player for each mini-game, except for the Treasure Maze mini-game, where the Jumanji board game spirit provides instructions instead. Notably, players cannot play the actual Jumanji board game from the film. All of these mini-games contain rounds (or levels) and when players reach a goal, that level is cleared and the player advances to a more difficult version of the mini-game. The player must try to score as many points as possible, and set the best high score.

A party video game based on the film was released in Europe for the PlayStation 2 in 2006.

In 2007, Fuji Shoji released a Pachinko game, using clips from the film and also 3D rendered CGI anime character designs for the game as part of the screen interaction.

Indian company Doptale created Grendhaa in 2017, a board game incorporating the "real-life effects" of Jumanji.

The Noble Collection created a special "Collector's Replica" based on the game's original board game form that also incorporates elements of the game's video game incarnation from the later films.

Theme Parks 
A Jumanji-themed dark ride opened at Gardaland in the 2022 season, featuring a large animatronic figure.

Legacy
In 2005, Jumanji was listed 48 in Channel 4's documentary 100 Greatest Family Films, just behind Dumbo, Spider-Man and Jason & the Argonauts.

In 2011, Robin Williams recorded an audiobook for Van Allsburg's book's 30th edition to coincide its release.

References

External links

 
 
 

 
1990s fantasy adventure films
1990s coming-of-age films
1995 comedy films
1990s fantasy comedy films
1990s teen fantasy films
1995 films
Jungle adventure films
Alternate timeline films
American action adventure films
American adventure comedy films
American adventure thriller films
American children's adventure films
American children's fantasy films
American coming-of-age films
American fantasy adventure films
American fantasy comedy films
American dark fantasy films
Fictional games
Films about board games
Films about animals
Films about orphans
Films about post-traumatic stress disorder
Films about shapeshifting
Films about siblings
Films adapted into television shows
Films based on children's books
Films based on works by Chris Van Allsburg
Films directed by Joe Johnston
Films scored by James Horner
Films set in the 1800s
Films set in 1869
Films set in the 1960s
Films set in 1969
Films set in the 1990s
Films set in 1995
Films set in New Hampshire
Films shot in Maine
Films shot in New Hampshire
Films shot in Vancouver
TriStar Pictures films
Interscope Communications films
Films produced by Scott Kroopf
1990s English-language films
1990s American films